Baegun Station is a subway station on the Seoul Subway Line 1 and the Gyeongin Line.

Vicinity

Exit 1: Daeju Parkville APT
Exit 2: Bupyeong Library
Exit 3: Sinchon Elementary School

References

Seoul Metropolitan Subway stations
Metro stations in Incheon
Railway stations opened in 1996
Bupyeong District